A gubernatorial election was held on 16 March 2014 to elect the next governor of , a prefecture of Japan located in the Chūbu region of Honshu island..

Candidates 

Masanori Tanimoto, 68, incumbent since 1994, endorsed by SDP, Komeito, LDP, DPJ.
Yuichiro Kawa, 42, a former prefectural DPJ assembly member.
Yoshinobu Kimura, 62, endorsed by JCP.

Results

References 

2014 elections in Japan
Ishikawa gubernational elections